Thomas Davies was an English footballer who played 65 league and cup games at left-back for Burslem Port Vale between 1899 and 1903.

Career
Davies started out with Nantwich, helping the club win the Cheshire Junior Cup in 1896 and reach the Cheshire Senior Cup final in 1898. He joined Burslem Port Vale in August 1899 and played three Second Division games in the 1899–1900 season, before making 29 league appearances in the 1900–01 campaign. He played 25 league games in 1901–02, but left the Athletic Ground after he featured just once in the 1902–03 season. He had played 65 league and cup games for the Burslem club. He returned to Nantwich for the "Wychers" 1903–04 campaign in The Combination.

Career statistics
Source:

Honours
Nantwich
Cheshire Junior Cup: 1896
Cheshire Senior Cup runner-up: 1898

References

Year of birth missing
Year of death missing
English footballers
Association football fullbacks
Nantwich Town F.C. players
Port Vale F.C. players
English Football League players